Ladislav Divila (born 14 May 1944) is a Czech former ski jumper. He competed in the normal hill event at the 1968 Winter Olympics, representing Czechoslovakia. On 8 March 1969, he crashed at ski flying world record distance at 156 metres (512 ft) on Vikersundbakken hill in Vikersund, Norway.

Invalid ski jumping world record

 Not recognized! Crash at world record distance.

References

External links

1944 births
Living people
Czech male ski jumpers
Olympic ski jumpers of Czechoslovakia
Ski jumpers at the 1968 Winter Olympics
Sportspeople from Přerov